The Association of Norwegians in Denmark (Danish and Norwegian: Den Norske Forening) is an association for Norwegians in Denmark. It was founded in 1963 and is headquartered in the Norwegian House at Amager Boulevard 111 in Copenhagen.

See also
 Norwegian Society
 Schæffergården

References

External links
 Official website

Diaspora organizations in Denmark
Organizations based in Copenhagen
Organizations established in 1963
1963 establishments in Denmark